Monique Ambers (born 21 December 1970) is an American retired basketball player and coach.

References

External links 

1970 births
Living people
American expatriate basketball people in China
American expatriate basketball people in France
American expatriate basketball people in Germany
American expatriate basketball people in Greece
American expatriate basketball people in Italy
American expatriate basketball people in South Korea
American expatriate basketball people in Spain
American women's basketball coaches
American women's basketball players
Arizona State Sun Devils women's basketball players
Basketball players from California
Centers (basketball)
Heilongjiang Dragons players
Phoenix Mercury draft picks
Phoenix Mercury players
Sacramento Monarchs coaches
Sacramento Monarchs players